{{DISPLAYTITLE:C23H30N2O4}}
The molecular formula C23H30N2O4 (molar mass : 398.49 g/mol) may refer to:

 Desacetoxyvindoline
 Mitragynine, an indole alkaloid
 Pholcodine